The Compagnie du Katanga was a concession company of the Congo Free State that engaged in mining in the Katanga Province.

History

The company was founded by Leopold II in 1891 to occupy part of the Free State in order to dissuade a British claim on the land.
It was formed by the Compagnie du Congo pour le Commerce et l'Industrie (CCCI) and a group of English investors.
The company received 99-year mineral exploitation right on one third of the land and preferential rights for twenty years on the remainder.
The company explored the area and found rich deposits of copper.

In 1899 the company and the Free State government formed the Comité Special du Katanga (CSK) to administer the whole province, with its own police force.
In many ways the CSK was independent of the administration at Boma and reported directly Brussels.
The CSK hired Robert Williams of Tanganyika Concessions (TCL) to prospect for minerals.
In 1906 the Compagnie du Katanga, the CSK and the TCL formed the mining company Union Minière du Haut-Katanga (UMHK).

References

Bibliography

External links
 

Belgian colonisation in Africa
History of Katanga
1891 establishments in the Congo Free State
Congo Free State
Companies established in 1891
Mining in Katanga Province